Caturrita ("Monk Parakeet") is a bairro in the District of Sede in the municipality of Santa Maria, in the Brazilian state of Rio Grande do Sul. It is located in north Santa Maria.

Villages 
The bairro contains the following villages: Caturrita, Vila Bela União, Vila Jordânia, Vila Negrine, Vila Nossa Senhora da Conceição, Vila Portão Branco, Vila Santa Rita, Vila São José.

References 

Bairros of Santa Maria, Rio Grande do Sul